Richard Wallis Egan (born March 24, 1937) is an American retired professional baseball player who played four seasons for the Detroit Tigers, California Angels, and Los Angeles Dodgers of Major League Baseball.

After retiring from playing, Egan served as a special assistant to Detroit Tigers President, CEO, and General Manager Dave Dombrowski.

References

Retrosheet
Venezuelan Professional Baseball League

1937 births
Baseball players from California
Birmingham Barons players
California Angels players
Denver Bears players
Detroit Tigers players
Detroit Tigers scouts
Erie Sailors players
Hawaii Islanders players
Indios de Oriente players
Industriales de Valencia players
Iowa Oaks players
Jacksonville Suns players
Knoxville Smokies players
Living people
Los Angeles Dodgers players
Major League Baseball pitchers
Miami Marlins scouts
Minor league baseball managers
Montgomery Rebels players
Portland Beavers players
San Diego Padres (minor league) players
Spokane Indians players
Stockton Ports players
Syracuse Chiefs players
Tigres de Aragua players
American expatriate baseball players in Venezuela